Microschismus is a genus of moths in the family Alucitidae.

Species
Microschismus antennatus T. B. Fletcher, 1909 (South Africa)
Microschismus cymatias Meyrick, 1918
Microschismus fortis (Walsingham, 1881)
Microschismus lenzi Ustjuzhanin & Kovtunovich, 2011 (Zimbabwe)
Microschismus premnias Meyrick, 1913
Microschismus reginus Ustjuzhanin & Kovtunovich, 2011 (South Africa)
Microschismus sceletias Meyrick, 1911
Microschismus sterkfontein Ustjuzhanin & Kovtunovich, 2011 (South Africa)

References

 Ustjuzhanin & Kovtunovich, 2011. A revision of the genus Microschismus Fletcher, 1909 (Lepidoptera: Alucitidae).African Invertebrates;2011, Vol. 52 Issue 2, p557 (abstract)

Alucitidae
Ditrysia genera